Rosedale is a historic Italianate style house that was built in 1855, near Columbus, Mississippi.

It was built according to designs of architect Samuel Sloan, perhaps from a pattern-book.  The interior restoration was designed by Volz O'Connell Hutson of Austin, Texas.

It was listed on the U.S. National Register of Historic Places in 1994.

References

Houses on the National Register of Historic Places in Mississippi
Italianate architecture in Mississippi
Houses completed in 1855
Houses in Lowndes County, Mississippi
National Register of Historic Places in Lowndes County, Mississippi